A livery is a uniform, insignia or symbol that denotes a relationship between the wearer of the livery and an individual or corporate body.

Livery may also refer to:

Livery yard, a stable in which horse owners pay to keep their horses
Aircraft livery, a set of insignia which operators apply to their aircraft
Boat livery, a boathouse or dock where boats are let out for hire
Canoe livery, a boat livery specializing in canoes or kayaks
Taxicab livery, a set of insignia applied to taxicabs
Livery collar, a type of jewelry
Livery company, a type of company in the City of London, United Kingdom
Livery in law, in legal terminology
Operation Livery, a British naval air operation during World War II

See also
List of airline liveries and logos
British Rail corporate liveries